Trifolium virginicum, the Kate's Mountain clover, is a species of flowering plant in the family Fabaceae. It is native to West Virginia and Virginia in the United States, growing only on the Piedmont mafic barren, with Kate's Mountain as the type locality. Trifolium virginicum is the symbol of the West Virginia Native Plant Society, which claims it can also be found in Maryland and Pennsylvania.

References

virginicum
Endemic flora of the United States
Flora of Virginia
Flora of West Virginia
Plants described in 1893
Flora without expected TNC conservation status